Teloschistes is a genus of lichens in the family Teloschistaceae. It was circumscribed by Norwegian botanist Johannes Musaeus Norman in 1852. The name of the genus means "split ends".

Species
Teloschistes chrysophthalmus 
Teloschistes fasciculatus 
Teloschistes flavicans 
Teloschistes inflatus 
Teloschistes sieberianus 
Teloschistes spinosus 
Teloschistes velifer 
Teloschistes xanthoroides

References

Teloschistales
Teloschistales genera
Lichen genera
Taxa described in 1853